Stāmeriena Palace is a palace built in Historicist style from 1835 to 1843 in the historical region of Vidzeme, northern Latvia. Its first owner was Johann Gottlieb von Wolff (1756-1817) and subsequently his descendants.

In 1905, during the Russian Revolution, the manor was burned down, but was later renewed by Baron Boris von Wolff (1850-1917) in 1908. Although it was rebuilt in different style it is considered one of the brightest architectural achievements of his time in French Neo-Renaissance style in Latvia. Stāmeriena palace was one of the few manors which were not nationalized after Latvian agrarian reforms in 1920s. So the von Wolff family continued to live there through the 1930s until 1939. The palace was presented as a gift to Andrei Pilar von Pilchau, the first - and homosexual - husband of the palace's owner Alexandra von Wolff-Stomersee. The Sicilian writer Giuseppe Tomasi di Lampedusa lived in the Stāmeriena palace for a few years in the 1930s as he married the palace's owner Alexandra von Wolff-Stomersee (1894-1982) in 1932.

After the second world war a technical school of agriculture was located in the palace. Later it was used as the administration building of the local state owned farm (sovkhoz).
After the 1992 palace stood empty for six years but in 1998 it became a private property and since then the palace and landscape park around it are being restored and are open to visitors.

See also
List of palaces and manor houses in Latvia

References

External links
 
 Stāmeriena Castle website

Palaces in Latvia
Art Nouveau architecture in Latvia
Art Nouveau houses
Buildings and structures completed in 1908
Buildings and structures completed in 1843
Historicist architecture
1843 establishments in the Russian Empire
Gulbene Municipality